This is a list of lighthouses in Sudan.

See also
List of lighthouses in Egypt (to the north)
List of lighthouses in Eritrea (to the south-east)
 Lists of lighthouses and lightvessels

References

External links
 

Sudan
Lighthouses
Lighthouses